Catloaf (also spelled as cat loaf and sometimes known as hovercat, tugboat or loafing) is an internet phenomenon and term used to describe a domestic cat's sitting position in which its paws and tail are tucked under the body, forming a loaf-like shape. A speculation for the sitting position indicates that the cat is relaxed and feels unthreatened, and therefore has no need to sit in a position where it would have to attack. Another potential reason for this sitting position is for the cat to maintain a comfortable body temperature without having to move.

American cartoonist B. Kliban had noted the similarity between the shapes of cats and meatloaves as early as 1975. However, widespread popularity of the word had not gained peak popularity until the 2010s on social media sites such as Reddit and Twitter, as well as Facebook, where the sitting position is also known as "tugboat" in the "Tuggin'" group.

References

Cats
Internet memes introduced in the 2010s
2010s in Internet culture